There are several volcanoes in the territory of Malaysia, mostly located in the state of Sabah.

See also 
 List of mountains in Malaysia

References

Further reading 

Malaysia
 
Volcanoes